Behr Shmuel Issachar Leyb ben Judah Moses Eybeschuetz Perlhefter (c. 1650 in Prague – after 1713 in Prague) was a Jewish scholar and rabbi. His educated wife Bella bat R. Jakob Perlhefter (Isabell, Bella, Bilah, died 1710 in Prague), corresponded in Hebrew and wrote the preface on the Yiddish book “Beer Sheva”.  Perlhefter taught the German Christian Hebraist Johann Christoph Wagenseil Hebrew and Jewish literature. Beer Perlhefter is considered an important figure of the Sabbatian movement. After the death of the pseudo-Messiah Sabbatai Zevi (1626-1676), he restored the Sabbatian theology at the school of Abraham Rovigo and called the Pseudomessiah Mordecai Mokiach to Italy.

External links
 Tishby, Yeshaya: The First Sabbatean Maggid in the Study Hall of R. Abraham Rovigo, Zion 1 (1957), pp. 21–55, (Hebrew).
 Riemer, Nathanael: Zwischen Tradition und Häresie. ´Beer Sheva` – eine Enzyklopädie des jüdischen Wissens der Frühen Neuzeit. Harrassowitz, Wiesbaden 2010 (German).
 Rachel L Greenblatt: ´My Happiness Overturned`. Mourning, Memory and a Woman's Writing in ´Book of Seven Springs`, Lecture on the Early Modern Workshop. Volume 8: Egodocuments: Revelation of the Self in the Early Modern Period, 2011, University of Texas at Austin, August 21–23 (English).
 
 Elqayam, Avraham: The Rebirth of the Messiah: New Discovery of R. Issachar Baer Perlhefter", Kabbalah: Journal for the Study of Jewish Mystical Text, 1 (1996), pp. 85–166 (Hebrew).

1650 births
1713 deaths
Rabbis from Prague
17th-century Bohemian rabbis
18th-century Bohemian rabbis
Sabbateans
Kabbalists